Aoraia rufivena, the rufous-veined aoraia,  is a species of moth of the family Hepialidae. It is endemic to New Zealand. A. rufivena was described by John S. Dugdale in 1994.

The wingspan is 60–74 mm for males. The forewing ground colour is pale and dark brown, with an ash-white pattern. Females are sub-brachypterous with a wingspan of 55–68 mm. Adults are on wing from January to April.

References

External links

Citizen science observations

Moths described in 1994
Hepialidae
Moths of New Zealand
Endemic fauna of New Zealand
Endemic moths of New Zealand